Manica District is a district of Manica Province in western Mozambique. The principal town is Manica. The district is located in the west of the province, and borders with Báruè District in the north, Vanduzi District in the east, Sussundenga District in the south, and with Zimbabwe in the west. It has a population of 213,206 as of 2007.

Geography
The main river in the district is the Revuè River, a major tributary of the Buzi River, with its tributaries.

Demographics
As of 2005, 46% of the population of the district was younger than 15 years. 50% did speak Portuguese. The most common mothertongue is Chitwe language. 51% were analphabetic, mostly women.

Administrative divisions
The district is divided into five postos, Manica (one locality), Machipanda (two localities), Messica (three localities), Mavonde (two localities), and Vanduzi (three localities).

In 2013, the Mozambican government created Vanduzi District out of Manica District.

Economy
5% of the households in the district have access to electricity.

Agriculture
In the district, there are 37,000 farms which have on average  of land. The main agricultural products are corn, cassava, cowpea, peanut, sorghum, sweet potato, and rice.

Transportation
This includes  of national roads, which connect Beira with Zimbabwe.

A railroad connecting Beira with Zimbabwe via Machipanda crosses the district.

References

Districts in Manica Province